Dolly Abou Shahine (born July 2, 1985) is a Lebanese singer, actress, and fashion designer.

Biography 
Dolly Shahine was born in Aley District to a Lebanese Brazilian father and a Lebanese mother and raised as a Catholic. She was named after the American country singer Dolly Parton. She studied journalism for one year in Lebanon, before she went to London to study music theory for five years.

Personal life 
Dolly Shahine married Lebanese model Sami Qalib in 2001. They officially divorced in 2009. 
In late 2009 She married Lebanese director Bakhos Alwan. They have a daughter called Nour. Shahine announced in 2014, that she and Alwan were divorcing and the couple had officially separated due to irreconcilable differences. They stayed on good terms.

Discography

Albums 
 Wala Kol El Banat (2009)	
 Cinderella (2017)

Singles and music videos
{| class="wikitable" style="font-size: 95%;"
! Year !! Title !! Album !! Video Clip Director !! Language/Dialect
|- 
| 2005 ||Momo Einy|| N/A||Mark Abi Rached|| Lebanese/Moroccan Arabic
|- 
| 2006 || Ana Zay Ay Bent||N/A||Khalid Youssef || Egyptian Arabic
|-
| 2006 || Dawebny Fik||N/A||Khalid Youssef||Egyptian Arabic 
|-
| 2006 ||Gher Kol El Banat||Wala Kol El Banat||Mohamed Saeid|| Egyptian Arabic
|-
| 2007 ||Ayezny Alok||N/A|| Mark Abi Rached|| Egyptian Arabic
|- 
| 2007 || Nazra Wahda||Wala Kol El Banat|| Oliver Ojiel ||Lebanese Arabic
|- 	
| 2008 || Ana Geit||N/A|| Jad Sawaya ||Egyptian Arabic	
|-	
| 2009 || Gedid Alaya||Wala Kol El Banat|| Bakhos Alwan ||Egyptian Arabic	
|-	
| 2014 || Sana Saeeda||N/A|| Bakhos Alwan ||Egyptian Arabic	
|- 	
| 2017 || Nazarato||Cinderella|| Bakhos Alwan ||Egyptian Arabic	
|- 	
| 2018 || Law Aal Foraa||Cinderella|| Bakhos Alwan ||Egyptian Arabic
|- 	
| 2018 || Habeebi Gheir||N/A|| Dolly Shahine ||Gulf Arabic
|}

Filmography
FilmWeja (2006)Khames Njoom (2007)Al Shayateen (2007)Nems Bond (2008)El Mesh Muhandes Hassan (2008)Bidoun Riqaba (2009)Tita Rahiba (2012)Tatah (2013)Zarf Sehi (2014)

 TV series Adham El Sharkawy (2008)	Sharif wa Noss (2009)	El Morafa'a'' (2015)

References

External links

Living people
Lebanese female models
21st-century Lebanese women singers
Lebanese film actresses
1980 births
Lebanese people of Brazilian descent
Lebanese Melkite Greek Catholics
Singers who perform in Egyptian Arabic
People from Aley District